The Bristol Premier Combination is a football competition based in and around Bristol, England. The league is affiliated to the Gloucestershire County FA, and it has two divisions, the Premier Division and Premier One.  The Premier Division sits at level 12 of the English football league system and is one of three feeders to the Gloucestershire County League.  In turn, the Bristol Premier Combination is fed by the Bristol and District League.

History
The league was formed in 1957 and at one stage was known as the County of Avon Premier Combination.

Among the clubs that have left the Bristol Premier Combination and now compete at a higher level are:

Bitton
Bristol St George (now known as Roman Glass St. George)
Cadbury Heath
Clevedon (now known as Clevedon Town)
Keynsham Town
Lawrence Weston Hallen (now known as Hallen)
Longwell Green Sports
Mangotsfield United
Mendip United (now known as Mendip Broadwalk)
Oldland (now known as Oldland Abbotonians)
Yate YMCA (now known as Yate Town)

2022–23 Members

Premier 
AEK Boco Reserves
Bradley Stoke Town 
Chipping Sodbury Town Reserves 
DRG SV Frenchay 
Hallen Reserves
Hanham Athletic Saturday 
Longwell Green Sports Reserves
Nicholas Wanderers 
Olveston United
Shaftesbury Crusade  
St Nicholas 
Totterdown United
Winterbourne United

Premier One
AEK Boco 'A'
AFC Mangotsfield
Cribbs 'A'
De-Veys
Greyfriars Athletic
Hambrook
Iron Acton
Mendip Broadwalk Reserves  
Nicholas Wanderers Reserves 
Oldland Abbotonians Reserves
Real Thornbury 
Shirehampton Reserves 
Stapleton 
Wick Reserves

Recent champions

External links
Official Website – TheFA.com
Football mitoo

References

 
Recurring events established in 1957
Football leagues in England
Sports leagues established in 1957
Football in Bristol